Middleburgh is a village in Schoharie County, New York, United States. The population was 1,500 at the 2010 census.
The Village of Middleburgh is in the southwestern part of the Town of Middleburgh and is west of Albany.

History 
The village is the site where the town was first settled around 1712-1713. Initially known as Weiser's Dorf, the first Palatine settlement in the Schoharie Valley was established by Johan Conrad Weiser in what is now the Village of Middleburgh. This settlement eventually came to be named after Middelburg, the capital of Zeeland, one of the provinces of the then-Dutch Republic and the current Netherlands. The village was incorporated in 1881.

"Middleburg" and "Middleburgh" have been used interchangeably in the past, as seen on old maps of the area. In the early 1980s the final "H" was added to road signs outside the village. In 2004, the Post Office finally added the "H". The only "missing H" to be found today is the name on the "Middleburg Diner".

The historic Middleburgh-Schoharie Railroad was half-based in the village. The Bellinger-Dutton House, Dr. Christopher S. Best House and Office, St. Mark's Evangelical Lutheran Church, United States Post Office-Middleburgh, and Upper Middleburgh Cemetery are listed on the National Register of Historic Places.

The Village of Middleburgh was devastated in 2011 by the effects of Hurricane Irene. However, due to a massive volunteer effort led and organized by local residents, the community was able to successfully recover and rebuild.

Geography
Middleburgh is located at  (42.596627, -74.330922).

According to the United States Census Bureau, the village has a total area of 1.2 square miles (3.1 km2), all land. 

The Schoharie Creek passes the village, where it is joined by the Little Schoharie Creek and Stony Creek.

New York State Route 30 (River Street) and New York State Route 145 (Main Street) intersect in the village at the bridge over Schoharie Creek.

Demographics

As of the census of 2000, there were 1,398 people, 595 households, and 371 families residing in the village. The population density was 1,163.6 people per square mile (449.8/km2). There were 667 housing units at an average density of 555.2 per square mile (214.6/km2). The racial makeup of the village was 96.78% White, 0.29% Black or African American, 0.72% Native American, 0.21% Asian, 1.07% from other races, and 0.93% from two or more races. Hispanic or Latino of any race were 2.65% of the population.

There were 595 households, out of which 28.6% had children under the age of 18 living with them, 46.6% were married couples living together, 11.4% had a female householder with no husband present, and 37.6% were non-families. 34.3% of all households were made up of individuals, and 16.8% had someone living alone who was 65 years of age or older. The average household size was 2.33 and the average family size was 2.98.

In the village, the population was spread out, with 25.3% under the age of 18, 6.4% from 18 to 24, 26.7% from 25 to 44, 23.3% from 45 to 64, and 18.4% who were 65 years of age or older. The median age was 39 years. For every 100 females, there were 89.7 males. For every 100 females age 18 and over, there were 83.7 males.

The median income for a household in the village was $30,583, and the median income for a family was $44,286. Males had a median income of $31,438 versus $25,313 for females. The per capita income for the village was $17,948. About 12.2% of families and 17.8% of the population were below the poverty line, including 27.9% of those under age 18 and 10.8% of those age 65 or over.

Politics
Middleburgh is one of the more prominent villages within Schoharie County and has a Village Board consisting of four trustees and a mayor. Currently the Trustees and the Mayor serve four-year terms. Before 1985 the terms were two years, but a local law changed this. The 2020 general election took place in September, delayed from its original March schedule due to the Coronavirus pandemic.

 Mayor:
-- Trish Bergan, of Clauverwie Road was elected without formal opposition on September 15, 2020, receiving 92 votes as opposed to 5 votes cast for various write-ins. Bergan previously served as Village Trustee and Deputy Mayor before being appointed as Mayor on April 13, 2020. 
 Trustees:

-- Robert Tinker, of Indian Acres, elected with 52% of the vote in 2012. Re-elected with 49% of the vote in 2016. Re-elected in 2020 with 51% of the vote.

-- Sheryl Adams, of Upper Main Street, appointed to the Village Board in 2012 to fill former Trustee Avitabile's seat. Won re-election for the remainder of the seat's term in 2013 defeating former Mayoral candidate John Shaw, Jr. Successfully gained a four-year term in 2014 with 49% of the vote and was re-elected in both 2018 and 2021. 

-- Timothy Knight, of Main Street, was appointed to the Village Board during the COVID-19 lockdown in March 2020 to fill retiring Trustee Bill Morton's seat. Knight was elected to a full-term on September 15, 2020, along with Mayor Bergan and Trustee Tinker. He is currently the appointed Deputy Mayor. 

-- Shane Foland, of Gorge Road, was elected in a special election to the Village Board in March 2021 with 94% of the vote. He was subsequently re-elected to a full four-year term in November 2021. 

 Former Officials:

-- Matthew Avitabile, of Wells Avenue defeated incumbent William Ansel-McCabe with 53% of the vote in the 2012 Mayoral Election. Avitabile was a Village Trustee for five years before the 2012 election. Re-elected over write-in candidate Ansel-McCabe with 90% of the vote in 2016. Avitabile resigned as Mayor at the end of his legal term, extended by two weeks by Governor Cuomo's executive order due to Coronavirus in the spring of 2020, and was subsequently reappointed to the Middleburgh Village Board as a Village Trustee. Avitabile's tenure in local government ended in March 2021 with Trustees honoring him with a "Matthew Avitabile Day."

2016

Incumbent Mayor Matthew Avitabile announced his intention to seek a second term with Trustees Morton and Tinker. Former Mayor William Ansel-McCabe briefly entered the race but did not submit a petition to receive a place on the ballot but supporters fielded a write in campaign. Mayor Avitabile was elected with 90% of the vote and Trustees Tinker and Morton received a total of 98% combined.

2014

Deputy Mayor Thomas Gruning declined to run for a second term. Incumbent Sheryl Adams was joined by newcomer Lillian Bruno of Grove Street. Both ran under the Middleburgh First Party, which won its fourth straight election. In March, Bruno won 44 votes, Adams 43 and were elected to four-year terms.

2013

In November 2012, former Mayor Gary Hayes submitted a petition to dissolve the 132-year-old Village. He cited excess cost and the "apex" the Village and Town has reached in consolidation. Citing New York State's Article 19, which expired in 2010, his petition contained over 140 names.

The question of dissolution went to a vote on February 19, 2013. The voters rejected Mr. Hayes' proposal 344-71.

In March, Trustee Sheryl Adams, appointed to fill Mayor Matthew Avitabile's unexpired term, won a one-year term to the Board of Trustees.

2012

In March 2012 incumbent Mayor Ansel-McCabe of the "Phoenix" party was defeated by Trustee Matthew Avitabile of the "Middleburgh First" party 53-46%. Thomas Wargo of the "Direct Democracy" party of Scribner Avenue received 1% of the vote.

2010

Trustee Avitabile and Trustee Bonnie Ingraham's seats were up for election. Trustee Ingraham announced that she would not seek re-election. Running for these two seats are Avitabile, Dr. Thomas Gruning of Grove Street and Paul Hayes of MT Path who had previously run in 1996. Elections were held on March 16.

Avitabile and Gruning were running jointly under the "Middleburgh First" party while Mr. Hayes was under the "New Beginning" party. His brother, former Mayor Gary Hayes, decided not to run.

The "Middleburgh First" Party received 88% of the vote while the "New Beginning" received 12%. Turnout was very high despite being an off-year election.

2008

Mayor William Ansel-McCabe won re-election over Assistant Fire Chief John Shaw in the top race that year. McCabe received several fewer votes than in 2004 and caucused with Trustees Bowman and Ingraham.

Trustee Gerald Bowman and Charles "Butch" Ingraham won re-election in a surprisingly tight race against political newcomer Andrew Adams. Adams came up short against the two incumbents in the three-way race. Ingraham's wife Bonnie was elected to a two-year term running unopposed.

Recent elections

Italics denote incumbent

|-

|-

References

External links
  Village of Middleburgh, NY
 Village of Middleburgh, NY, Main Site
 Official Middleburgh Blog

Villages in New York (state)
Villages in Schoharie County, New York